The Denali operating system is "an IA-32 virtual machine monitor, that allows for untrusted services to be run in isolated (protected) domains."

Denali makes use of paravirtualization to support high performance virtual machines, even on the notoriously uncooperative x86 architecture (see x86 virtualization).  The envisioned usage model for the original Denali was to support virtual machines running lightweight single application operating systems for internet services.  A later revision of Denali (uDenali) includes support for running full-featured operating systems.

References

 "Lightweight virtual machines for distributed and networked systems". Developer's page. University of Washington.
 "Scale and performance in the Denali isolation kernel". Association for Computing Machinery.

External links 
 Denali, Lightweight virtual machines for distributed and networked systems

Virtualization software